Leeds Building Society is a building society based in Leeds, England. It serves approximately 719,000 customers across the United Kingdom, who together hold £9.9 billion in savings balances and is the fifth largest building society in the UK.

History

The society was registered as the Leeds and Holbeck (Permanent) Building Society in 1875, though the society originated from a group called the Leeds Union Operative Land and Building Society which formed in 1845. The society was renamed to Leeds Building Society in September 2005. It has 65 branches across the UK, with 29 located in Yorkshire, and previously had two international branches located in Gibraltar and Dublin, Ireland. The head office is located on Sovereign Street in Leeds city centre.

It should not be confused with the defunct Leeds Permanent Building Society, which was also known as The Leeds, which merged with the Halifax Building Society on 1 August 1995.

On 1 August 2006, following approval by the Mercantile members and confirmation by the Financial Services Authority (FSA), Leeds Building Society merged with Mercantile Building Society, in North Shields, an area of North Tyneside, in Tyne and Wear. Mercantile members overwhelmingly supported the proposal at the Society’s AGM at the end of April with 97% of the votes in favour of the merger. It is a member of the Building Societies Association.

Sponsorship

The Leeds Building Society is also the main shirt sponsor of the Super League rugby league side Leeds Rhinos.

Arms

References

External links

 

Building societies of England
Banks established in 1875
Organizations established in 1875
Companies based in Leeds
1875 establishments in England